The Russian airline Smartavia serves the following scheduled destinations (as of April 2019).

Notes

Lists of airline destinations